The 2014 Vanier Cup, the 50th edition of the Canadian university football championship, took place on Saturday, November 29, 2014 at Molson Stadium in Montreal, Quebec. It featured the OUA champion McMaster Marauders and the RSEQ champion Montréal Carabins. This was the first appearance for the Carabins and the fourth for the Marauders. It was the first time that the city of Montreal hosted the Vanier Cup and it was organized by the Canadian Football League's Montreal Alouettes as opposed to a member CIS club. For the second consecutive year the championship game was played in the province of Quebec.

Semi-Championships 
The Vanier Cup is played between the champions of the Mitchell Bowl and the Uteck Bowl, the national semi-final games. In 2014, the Atlantic conference Loney Bowl champions visited the Ontario conference's Yates Cup champion for the Uteck Bowl. The winners of the Canada West conference Hardy Trophy visited the Dunsmore Cup Quebec championship team for the Mitchell Bowl.

Scoring summary
First Quarter
MCM - Crapigna 22 yd field goal (3:58)
MCM - Crapigna 35 yd field goal (12:32)

Second Quarter
MON - Simoneau 9 yd field goal (3:25)
MCM - Moore touchdown 50 yd rush and converted (5:38)

Third Quarter
MON - Enchill touchdown off 9 yd pass and converted (2:15)
MCM - Crapigna 43 yd field goal (9:54)
MCM - Crapigna 29 yd field goal (14:07)

Fourth Quarter
MON - Thomas touchdown 3 yd run and converted (4:12)
MON - Simoneau 13 yd field goal (12:15)
MCM - Crapigna blocked field goal from 35 yd (14:01)

Playoff bracket 

Number in parentheses represents seed in conference

References

External links
 Official website

Vanier Cup
Canadian football competitions in Montreal
Vanier Cup
Vanier Cup
U.S. Open Cup Final
2010s in Montreal